Caño is a barrio in the municipality of Guánica, Puerto Rico. Its population in 2010 was 1,788.

See also

 List of communities in Puerto Rico

References

External links

Barrios of Guánica, Puerto Rico